Randall L. Gardner (born 1958) is an American politician, he formerly served as a Republican member of the Ohio Senate, serving the 2nd District from 2013–2018.  He formerly held the same district from 2001 to 2008, and was a member of the Ohio House of Representatives from 1985 to 2000, and from 2008 to 2012. In January 2019 Governor Mike Dewine appointed Gardner as the Chancellor of  the Ohio Department of Higher Education.

Life and career
Gardner first entered Ohio politics in 1985, when he was appointed to a seat vacated by former State Representative Robert Brown.  He went on to serve 7 more full terms in the House, until being term limited in 2000.

With State Senator Bob Latta not running for reelection to his seat, Gardner decided to run in 2000.  He did, and in 2001, took his seat in the upper chamber. He quickly rose in the ranks, and served as president pro-tempore for the 125th General Assembly.  In 2004, he faced weak opposition, and once again won his senate bid.  He served as majority leader for the 126th General Assembly and the 127th General Assembly.

With then-Senate President Doug White facing term limits, Gardner and Senator Jeff Jacobson were looked at as two potential successors.  However, by the end of 2003, Gardner had withdrawn as a candidate, citing the desire to eliminate uncertainty in the caucus. Soon after, Jacobson in early 2004 became associated with a lobbying scandal, and Gardner once again emerged as a potential contender. In late summer 2004, he once again withdrew, and gave his support to Bill Harris, who went on to become president.

Gardner made it evident half way through 2007 that he intended to run for his old House seat in 2008, when he faced term limits in the Senate.  However, when Congressman Paul Gillmor was found dead in his Washington D.C. area apartment, Gardner was mentioned as a potential successor, but on September 17, 2007, Gardner stated he was staying in the state legislature. When Bob Latta ended up winning the congressional race to succeed Gillmor, Latta's 6th District Ohio House seat became vacant.  Gardner therefore resigned his Senate seat and was appointed early to the seat he was running for in the fall.  He was subsequently placed as ranking member of the Higher Education Subcommittee of the Finance Committee.

Return to the Ohio Senate
In 2012, Mark Wagoner opted to not run again for the 2nd District, opening up the election.  Gardner again opted to switch chambers, and ultimately won his former district with 58.66% of the vote over Democrat Jeff Bretz.

Committee assignments
Finance: Education Sub.--Chair
Education
Rules & Reference
Health & Human Services
Energy and Natural Resources

Electoral history

References

External links
Project Vote Smart - Senator Randall 'Randy' Gardner (OH) profile
Follow the Money - Randall Gardner
2006 2004 2002 2000 1998 1996 campaign contributions

1958 births
21st-century American politicians
Bowling Green State University alumni
Chancellors of the University System of Ohio
Living people
Republican Party members of the Ohio House of Representatives
Republican Party Ohio state senators
People from Bowling Green, Ohio